Laos national under-21 football team is the under-21 football team of Laos. The team participated in the Hassanal Bolkiah Trophy.

International tournaments

Players

Current squad 
This is the list players participated in the 2018 Hassanal Bolkiah Trophy.

See also 
 Laos national football team
 Laos women's national football team
 Laos national under-23 football team
 Laos national under-20 football team
 Laos national under-17 football team

References 

u21
Asian national under-21 association football teams